Bunker Bluff is a notable bluff that stands just south of the mouth of Gair Glacier and forms a part of the west wall of Mariner Glacier in Victoria Land. It was mapped by the United States Geological Survey from surveys and from U.S. Navy air photos, 1960–64, and named by the Advisory Committee on Antarctic Names for William H. Bunker, meteorologist at Hallett Station, 1962.

References
 

Cliffs of Victoria Land
Borchgrevink Coast